A stille omgang ("Silent Walk" or circumambulation) is an informal ritual that served as substitute for the Roman Catholic processions that were prohibited after the Reformation in the Netherlands in the 16th century. Best known is the Stille Omgang of Amsterdam, which is still performed every year in March.

This walk commemorates the Miracle of the Host of 16 March 1345, a Eucharistic miracle which involved a dying man vomiting upon being given the Holy Sacrament and last rites. The Host was then, due to liturgical regulations, put in the fire, but miraculously remained intact and could be retrieved from the ashes the following day. This miracle was quickly recognized by the municipality of Amsterdam and the bishop of Utrecht, and a large pilgrimage chapel, the Heilige Stede ("Holy Site") was built where the house had stood, and the Heiligeweg ("Holy Way") as the major pilgrimage route to it.

The Stille Omgang fell out of an individual practice since the 17th century, but was revived in a collective form in 1881, imitating in that way the medieval procession for the Miracle. During the 1950s up to 90.000 Catholics, from all over the Netherlands, walked the Silent Walk, nowadays usually about 5,000 people (2016) take part in it, following Mass in one of Amsterdam's churches. The Walk always occurs on the night of Saturday to Sunday following the start of the Mirakelfeest, which is on the first Wednesday after 12 March.

References

External links 
 Stille omgang website
 History Amsterdam Miracle/Stille Omgang 

History of Catholicism in the Netherlands
Catholic holy days
Religion in Amsterdam